Louis François Jean Chabot (27 April 1757 in Niort – 11 March 1837 in Sansais) was a French general. He was in charge of the French forces at the Siege of Corfu (1798–99) when a combined Russian and Ottoman force captured the island.

1757 births
1837 deaths
People from Niort
French generals
French military personnel of the French Revolutionary Wars
French commanders of the Napoleonic Wars
Grand Officiers of the Légion d'honneur
Barons of the First French Empire
French rule in the Ionian Islands (1797–1799)